Pavel Zakharov (born 3 May 2001) is a Russian professional basketball player who is currently a free agent. He played college basketball for the Gonzaga Bulldogs and California Baptist Lancers.

Early life and career
Zakharov was born in Sør-Varanger, Norway, and spoke Norwegian as a child. In June 2017, he attended the adidas EuroCamp in Treviso, Italy. In the 2017–18 season, Zakharov played for the junior team of Russian club Zenit Saint Petersburg in the VTB United Youth League. In 21 games, he averaged 10.4 points and 3.5 rebounds per game. In January 2018, Zakharov joined the CSKA Moscow junior team at Kaunas qualifiers for the Adidas Next Generation Tournament.

In the 2018–19 season, he played basketball for Montverde Academy, a prep school in Montverde, Florida with a prestigious basketball program. In November 2018, Zakharov drew attention as one of the best prospects at the National Prep Showcase in New Haven, Connecticut. During 2019 NBA All-Star Weekend, he attended the Basketball Without Borders camp.

Recruiting
Zakharov was considered a consensus four-star recruit and ranked among the top 50 players in the 2019 recruiting class by 247Sports and Rivals. On 19 November 2018, he committed to play college basketball for Gonzaga.

College career
Zakharov played sparingly during his two years at Gonzaga. After his sophomore season, he transferred to California Baptist.

National team career
Zakharov played for Russia at the 2017 FIBA U16 European Championship in Podgorica, Montenegro. In seven games, he averaged 8.4 points and 6.6 rebounds per game. He returned to national team duty at the 2018 FIBA U18 European Championship in Latvia, where he averaged 7.3 points and five rebounds per game over seven appearances.

Career statistics

College

|-
| style="text-align:left;"| 2019–20
| style="text-align:left;"| Gonzaga
| 19 || 0 || 4.5 || .619 || .500 || .600 || .9 || .2 || .1 || .2 || 1.9
|-
| style="text-align:left;"| 2020–21
| style="text-align:left;"| Gonzaga
| 10 || 0 || 2.8 || .333 || .500 || .500 || .4 || 0 || 0 || 0 || .8
|-
| style="text-align:left;"| 2021–22
| style="text-align:left;"| California Baptist
| 4 || 0 || 10.0 || .143 || .000 || .600 || 1.5 || .3 || .3 || 1.0 || 1.3
|- class="sortbottom"
| style="text-align:center;" colspan="2"| Career
| 33 || 0 || 4.6 || .459 || .333 || .591 || .8 || .1 || .1 || .2 || 1.5

References

External links
California Baptist Lancers bio
Gonzaga Bulldogs bio

2001 births
Living people
Basketball players from Saint Petersburg
California Baptist Lancers men's basketball players
Centers (basketball)
Gonzaga Bulldogs men's basketball players
Montverde Academy alumni
People from Sør-Varanger
Power forwards (basketball)
Russian expatriate basketball people in the United States
Russian men's basketball players